K. Christopher Beard is an American paleontologist, an expert on the primate fossil record and a 2000 MacArthur Fellowship "Genius" Award Winner. Beard's research is reshaping critical debates about the evolutionary origins of mammals, including primates, routinely questioning current thinking about their geographical origins. Dr. Beard is the former Curator of the Carnegie Museum of Natural History, and Mary R. Dawson Chair of Vertebrate Paleontology, at University of Pittsburgh. He is currently Distinguished Foundation Professor, Senior Curator at the University of Kansas.  He was co-author with Dan Gebo about an extinct primate from China. Dr. Beard also authored the book The Hunt for the Dawn Monkey: Unearthing the Origins of Monkeys, Apes and Humans. Beard was also part of the research teams that discovered Teilhardina, the earliest primate ever found in North America, and Eosimias, one of the earliest higher primates yet discovered.  He worked with NASA to scan a Tyrannosaurus rex skull. Beard received his PhD from the Functional Anatomy and Evolution Program at Johns Hopkins University School of Medicine in 1989.

Awards
 2000 MacArthur Fellows Program

Works
The hunt for the dawn monkey: unearthing the origins of monkeys, apes, and humans, University of California Press, 2004, 
"Mammalian Biogeography and Anthropoid Origins", Primate biogeography: progress and prospects, Editors Shawn M. Lehman, John G. Fleagle, Springer, 2006, 
"Basal Anthropoids", The primate fossil record, Editor Walter Carl Hartwig, Cambridge University Press, 2002, 
"Early Wasatchian Mammals From the Gulf Coastal Plain of Mississippi", Eocene biodiversity: unusual occurrences and rarely sampled habitats, Editor Gregg F. Gunnell, Springer, 2001,

References

External links
"K. Christopher Beard", Scientific Commons
"Fossil May Represent New Branch of Primates' Family Tree", The Washington Post, Apr 5, 1996

American paleontologists
University of Pittsburgh faculty
MacArthur Fellows
Year of birth missing (living people)
Living people
American curators